Snuper (meaning "Higher than Super") is a South Korean boy band formed by Widmay Entertainment in 2015, and is the first Korean pop group from the label. They debuted on November 16, 2015 with the extended play Shall We, its title track "Shall We Dance" and with six-members: Suhyun, Sangil, Taewoong, Woosung, Sangho and Sebin.

They are currently on an indefinite hiatus for four of the members to focus on military service. In the meantime, Sebin will be promoting as a member of the group Omega X.

Members 

 Suhyun (Hangul: 수현)
 Sangil (상일)
 Taewoong (태웅)
 Woosung (우성)
 Sangho (상호)
 Sebin (세빈)

Discography

Compilation albums

Extended plays

Singles

Soundtrack appearances

Filmography 
 Snuper Project (2016)

Awards and nominations

Asia Model Awards 

|-
| 2016
| Snuper
| Model Special Award
|

Asia Artist Awards 

|-
| 2017
| rowspan="3" | Snuper
| New Wave Award
| 
|-
| 2018
| Choice Award
| 
|-
| 2019
| Potential Award
|

Notes

References

External links 
 Snuper Official Website
 Snuper Twitter
 Snuper Facebook
 Snuper Instagram
 Snuper Youtube
 Snuper Vlive

K-pop music groups
South Korean boy bands
South Korean pop music groups
South Korean dance music groups
Musical groups from Seoul
Musical groups established in 2015
2015 establishments in South Korea